Dolichognatha ducke is a species of spider in the family Tetragnathidae, found in Brazil.

References

Tetragnathidae
Spiders of Brazil
Spiders described in 1993